Mills v R, [1986] 1 S.C.R. 863 is a leading constitutional decision of the Supreme Court of Canada concerning the right to a trial within a reasonable time under section 11(b) of the Canadian Charter of Rights and Freedoms and the meaning of a "court of competent jurisdiction" under section 24(1) of the Charter. The Court held that a thirty-one month delay was not unreasonable in the circumstances and that preliminary hearing judges are not within jurisdiction, superior courts can sometimes be within jurisdiction, and criminal trial courts were always within jurisdiction.

Background
For a period starting in 1973 James Mills was arrested and charged several times for robbery. In 1979 he was arrested in Nova Scotia with several outstanding charges. He was moved to London, Ontario to deal with some past charges. He did not appear in court until September 1981. There were a number of requests for adjournment. Eventually, the Charter came into force in April 1982. In May Mills made a motion for a stay of proceedings on the basis that it violated his right to be tried in a reasonable time under section 11(b) of the Charter.

The motions judge held that it was not a "court of competent jurisdiction" under section 24(1) and that even if it was the Charter could not apply retroactively to remedy violations that occurred before the enactment of the Charter. Both the Superior Court of Ontario and Ontario Court of Appeal dismissed the motion.

Judgment of the Supreme Court of Canada
Justice McIntyre, writing for the majority, dismissed the appeal.

See also
 List of Supreme Court of Canada cases

External links
 
 Case summary at mapleleafweb.com

Canadian Charter of Rights and Freedoms case law
Supreme Court of Canada cases
1986 in Canadian case law
Canadian criminal procedure case law